Skulls of the Shogun is a turn-based tactics video game developed by 17-Bit. The game is inspired by Advance Wars and features turn-based combat between undead samurai. Skulls of the Shogun was originally planned for a 2012 release on Xbox Live Arcade and Windows 8. Eventually it was released for Xbox 360, Microsoft Windows, and Windows Phone on January 30, 2013.

In June 2013, 17-Bit released Skulls of the Shogun: Bone-a-Fide Edition on Steam for Windows XP (SP 3) and up, with 4 new campaign levels, a new character, new multiplayer levels and progression system, and developer's commentary. In May 2014, Skulls of the Shogun was released for OS X and Linux as part of a Humble Bundle. In October 2014, the game was released on Ouya. In June 2015, the game was released on PlayStation 4.  On July 11, 2019, a Nintendo Switch port was released.

The game was adapted into an animated web series on Nerdist, featuring John DiMaggio as General Akamoto.

Story
In feudal Japan, General Akamoto stands on the verge of becoming Shogun. However, in his moment of triumph he is stabbed and killed by an unknown assailant. Arriving in the land of the dead, Akamoto learns that he must wait centuries before he can be judged worthy to enter the afterlife. Unwilling to wait he rallies other discontent samurai and makes to enter the afterlife by force. Battling the forces of the Shogun of the Dead, the ruler of the afterlife, he finds that they are taking orders from an impostor claiming to be him. He is shocked to discover it is none other than his lieutenant, Kurokawa, who reveals that it was he who killed Akamoto. Kurokawa, despite dying after Akamoto (having tripped and fallen on a spear) arrived in the after life before him, stealing his identity and the position that had been reserved for him by the Shogun.

Akamoto battles the Shogun's Generals through the four regions of the afterlife, as well as meeting the gods of each region: General Romeoka and the goddess Sakura, whom he is infatuated with, in the land of Eternal Blossoms; the ill-tempered and foul-mouthed Ikkaku and the chaotic Lightning god Raiden in the Land of Summer; the wise General Higure and Wind God Fujin, in the Land of the Golden Harvest. Unlike the others Higure recognizes Akamoto for who he is and attempts to guide him, warning of a greater danger. Defeating them Akamoto enters Kurokawa's region, the Land of Frozen Fortunes.

Confronting Kurokawa it is revealed that he and the Ice Goddess Yuki plan to usurp the Shogun, and that Yuki slowed Akamoto's arrival, allowing Kurokawa to arrive and steal his identity. Akamoto defeats them and the Shogun arrives, revealing that he knew of their treachery and had been using them to test Akamoto. Punishing the two the Shogun explains that he intends to make Akamoto his successor challenging him to defeat him and take his place. 
After his defeat the Shogun passes the title onto Akamoto, revealing the eternity of misery it entails: being hated, plotted against, and enduring countless meetings. The Shogun prepares to happily pass on, but is grabbed by Akamoto. Saying that he will need help, he eats his skull absorbing his power and becoming the new Shogun.

In the bonus Forbidden Isle levels, the player takes control of an unnamed samurai. Recently arrived to the land of the dead the samurai, a lieutenant of Akamoto in life, begins looking for him. Tresspasing on the island the samurai is forced to fight through the island's guard, led by Kurokawa, whom Akamoto has charged with watching over the region. Defeating Kurokawa, the samurai pushes on to find Akamoto, who has lost his way to the bureaucratic side of the Shogun position. Meeting Akamoto, the samurai reveals himself to actually be his wife Yoko, having entered the samurai afterlife after leading her late husband's army and becoming a warrior. Akamoto is relieved that she is not a rival out to take his position, however she continues their battle, believing he has grown too relaxed and needs a challenge. The two reconcile mid battle agreeing not to fight any longer.

Reception
Reviews for Skulls of the Shogun have been positive, and the Xbox 360 version has an 81% score on the aggregated site Metacritic. Rob Kershaw at The Digital Fix gave the game 8/10, praising its accessible but challenging gameplay, whilst also noting that it was occasionally difficult to distinguish between the different units on the battlefield.

References

External links 
 

2013 video games
Android (operating system) games
GameClub games
Indie video games
IOS games
Japan in non-Japanese culture
Linux games
Microsoft games
Microsoft XNA games
Multiplayer online games
MacOS games
Ouya games
PlayStation 4 games
PlayStation Network games
Turn-based tactics video games
Video games about samurai
Video games developed in the United States
Video games set in feudal Japan
Windows games
Windows Phone games
Xbox 360 games
Xbox 360 Live Arcade games